Charles Amédée de Noé, known as Cham (26 January 1818 – 6 September 1879), was a French caricaturist and lithographer. 

He was born in Paris and raised by a family who wished for him to attend a polytechnic school. He instead attended painting workshops hosted by Nicolas Charlet and Paul Delaroche and began work as a cartoonist. He eventually took up the pseudonym of "Cham".

In 1839, he published his first book, Monsieur Lajaunisse, which began a career that would span 40,000 drawings. In 1843, he began to have his illustrations be published in newspapers like Le Charivari, a publication where he was on staff for thirty years. Later works included Proudhon en voyage and Histoire comique de l'Assemblée nationale. He wrote a number of comic plays towards the end of his life. He died in Paris in 1879.

Depiction of people of color

Cham was known for his racist portrayal of French people of color. He was specifically targeting black women and drew them as animal-like, stereotyped caricatures. One example is his caricature of Alexander Dumas crossed dressed like a wet nurse, which was a popular profession for black women in the post-slavery era in 19th-century France. In a different caricature, he referred to the milk of a black wet-nurse as "black shoe polish".

References

External links

Lambiek Comiclopedia article.
Les folies de la Commune, a fully digitized work by "Cham"
Blog

1818 births
1879 deaths
Writers from Paris
French cartoonists
French caricaturists
French editorial cartoonists
French satirists
French lithographers
French comics artists